96 may refer to:

 96 (number)
 one of the years 96 BC, AD 96, 1996, 2096, etc.

Places
 Ninety Six, South Carolina
 Ninety-Six District, a former judicial district in the Carolinas, USA
 Ninety Six National Historic Site, in Ninety Six, South Carolina

Music
 The song "96 Tears" by garage rock band Question Mark and the Mysterians
 "96", a song by Uverworld, a Japanese band.
 "96 Quite Bitter Beings", a song recorded by rock band CKY

Sports
 The 2000 World Series, between the New York Yankees and New York Mets was the 96th Fall Classic
 Bill Voiselle, a pitcher for the New York Giants, Boston Braves, and Chicago Cubs, wore #96 — thus his nickname was "Ninety Six"
 Hannover 96, a German football club nicknamed "96"

Science
 Atomic number 96: curium
 In astronomy:
 Messier 96, a magnitude 10.5 spiral galaxy in the constellation Leo
 The New General Catalogue object NGC 96, a spiral galaxy in the constellation Andromeda
 The Saros number of the solar eclipse series which began in July 94 and ended in August 1374
 The Saros number of the lunar eclipse series which began in May 432 and ended in June 1712

Other uses
 '96 (film)
 96 dpi, the standard resolution of the monitor of an IBM-compatible computer running Microsoft Windows
 The number of surat Al-Alaq in the Qur'an
 The 96th Infantry Division (United States) was a unit of the United States Army in World War II
 96th Street (Manhattan)
 The 96th United States Congress met January 1979 to January 1981 during the last two years of President Jimmy Carter's administration
 Class of '96 was a short-lived Fox drama series which aired in 1993
 According to Gurdjieff's Fourth Way symbolism, the number of the Moon level
 The designation of American Interstate 96, a freeway in Michigan
 Mars 96 was a Russian orbiter launched in 1996
 Four New York City Subway stops along 96th Street in Manhattan:
 96th Street (IRT Broadway – Seventh Avenue Line), serving the  trains
 96th Street (IND Eighth Avenue Line), serving the  trains
 96th Street (IRT Lexington Avenue Line), serving the  trains
 96th Street (IND Second Avenue Line); under construction
 An Australian soap opera, Number 96.
 The Saab 96 car produced from 1960 to 1966
 STS-96 Space Shuttle Discovery Mission launched May 27, 1999
 , a German U-boat during World War II and subject of the film Das Boot
 Windows 96
 Melbourne tram route 96 the busiest tram route in Melbourne, Australia

See also
 
 List of highways numbered